Theresia Anna Lilian Maria Shields (née Schmon; August 1, 1933 – October 31, 2012) was an American actress, film producer, socialite, and model.

Life and career 
Shields was born and raised in Newark, New Jersey. She was the daughter of Theresa (née Dollinger), a house cleaner, and John Schmon, a chemist. She was of German, English, Scotch-Irish, and Welsh ancestry. In 1964, she married Francis Alexander Shields. Several months later, they filed for divorce. The couple's only child, Brooke (born 1965), became a well-known model and actress.

When Brooke was a child, they lived in a townhouse on the Upper East Side.

She acted alongside her daughter in Wanda Nevada, Endless Love, and Backstreet Dreams.

In 2009, Brooke announced that her mother was suffering from dementia. On October 31, 2012, Shields died at age 79 following a long illness related to dementia.

Filmography 
 1979 – Wanda Nevada, actress
 1981 – Endless Love, actress
 1983 – Sahara, producer
 1990 – Backstreet Dreams, actress

References

External links 
 
 Teri Shields at Find a Grave

1933 births
2012 deaths
People from the Upper East Side
American socialites
Female models from New Jersey
American film actresses
Actresses from Newark, New Jersey
Deaths from dementia in New York (state)
21st-century American women